Zvi Zamir born Zvicka Zarzevsky (born 3 March 1925) is a former major general in the Israel Defense Forces and the director of the Mossad from 1968 to 1974.  He is currently retired and lives in Israel.

Early life 
Born in Poland, Zamir immigrated with his family to the then British Mandate of Palestine when only seven months old. At the age of 18, Zamir began his military career, first as a soldier in the Haganah's Palmach, a unit that included future Israeli leaders such as Moshe Dayan and Yitzhak Rabin.

IDF posts 
During the 1948 Arab–Israeli War, Zamir fought in the newly created Israel Defense Forces as an infantry platoon leader. After the war he continued climbing the chain of command, becoming a licensed reconnaissance pilot for the Artillery branch, and was eventually promoted to the commander of the Southern Command. His final IDF post before being appointed Mossad director came in 1966, when he was appointed the military attaché to London.

Mossad 
During his tenure at the Mossad, he helped carry out Operation Wrath of God, the Israeli response to the Munich Massacre, and dealt with the lead up and aftermath of the Yom Kippur War in 1973. After the German government refused to accept an Israeli team during the Munich hostage crisis, Zamir was sent to observe any activities.  He was at the Fürstenfeldbruck airbase the night that the failed rescue attempt left all nine remaining Israeli hostages dead. Zamir was interviewed about the incident in 1999 when he spoke with the producer of One Day in September, a documentary on the massacre. In it he strongly criticized the German rescue effort for its complete lack of coordination. He had previously been interviewed on this subject for an NBC profile during their coverage of the 1992 Barcelona Olympics, and he has discussed the massacre several times since. Zamir currently resides in Zahala, a neighborhood in the north of Tel Aviv.

Publicity 
Zamir was played by Ami Weinberg in Steven Spielberg's 2005 movie Munich.

His memoirs were published in Hebrew in 2011 under the title With Open Eyes (Be'einaim Pekuhot).

References

Further reading 

 "Preventive measures" Zamir interview in 2006.
 One Day in September, (1999), a documentary by Kevin Macdonald.
 Raviv, Dan and Melman, Yossi. Every Spy a Prince: The Complete History of Israel's Intelligence Community. Boston: Houghton Mifflin Company, 1990.   p. 179

External links
 Itamar Eichner, Mossad chief in Yom Kippur War: Tell CIA No. 2 to kiss my ass, Ynetnews, December 17, 2019

Directors of the Mossad
Israeli generals
Israeli Jews
Jews in Mandatory Palestine
Palmach members
Polish emigrants to Mandatory Palestine
Israeli people of Polish-Jewish descent
1925 births
Living people
Israeli expatriates in the United Kingdom